The Burgess Falls is a cascade waterfall on the Falling Water River located within the Burgess Falls State Park, in Putnam and White counties, Tennessee, in the United States. The waterfall spills approximately  into a large limestone gorge enclosed by sheer  walls.  The Falling Water River enters Center Hill Lake downstream from Burgess Falls.

References 

Waterfalls of Tennessee
Landforms of Putnam County, Tennessee
Landforms of White County, Tennessee